The Crazymen or Crazymen is a punk metal, instrumental band that started 2001 in Motala, Sweden by Damir Bodnar (alias Mr. Tiger) and Oscar Nilsson (alias Mr. Lightning). In 2002, Marko Kilpeläinen (alias Mr. Rabbit) joined the group and they played their first show together that same year. The band name was inspired by old 1960s garage rock band names like The Trashmen.  In 2005, the band got signed to the Swedish independent record label Vuv Records and released their debut single “Your Hate, Old Man”. The band have since released several albums and EPs. on Vuv Records and also on U.K. based labels “Eden Records” and “Noise Control Records”. The band have played live shows with In flames, Skumdum, Attentat etc. and in 2013 they released the record “Beard Restrictions” on Vinyl Lp and digital with Vuv Records. The album received both good and bad reviews from the press and a couple of songs where played by Swedish national radio.

Members
 Damir Bodnar (Mr. Tiger) – drums, vocals, guitar, bas
 Oscar Nilsson (Mr. Lightning)- bass, vocals, guitar, drums
 Marko Kilpeläinen (Mr. Rabbit) – guitar, drums, bas, vocals.

Discography

Albums
Rabbit Execution - 2011
All Rabbits Must Hide - 2012
Beard Restrictions (For Rabbits Not For Goats) - 2013
The Question Mark - 2015
Sveriges Sista Dagar - 2015`
Forest Punker 5777 - 2017

EPs
Banned In Upsala - 2007
Year 2017, U Understand What We Mean  - 2010
Year 2018, Era Of The New Scene – 2010 (Noise Control Records)
Raggare O Punkarsvin Uber Alles – 2013
Shape Of Things To Come – 2020

Singles
"Your Hate Old Man” - 2005

Demos
Give It All Or Give It Nothing - 2003
The Crazymen EP - 2004
Punk For Rabbits, Humans Dare To Listen - 2004

Compilations
Punk For Rabbits Vol.2, Demos, Live, Studio 2004-2011 (Eden Records 2010)
Vuv Records Sampler Vol.1 - 2013
Vuv Records Sampler Vol.2 - 2014
Vuv Records Sampler Vol.2 - 2015

Biography
I Gud och humorns tjänst, 15 år av galenskap - 2017 (197 page book)

References

External links

Discogs page

Swedish punk rock groups
Swedish progressive metal musical groups
Musical groups established in 2001